Chris Van Allsburg (born June 18, 1949) is an American illustrator and writer of children's books. He has won two  Caldecott Medals for U.S. picture book illustration, for Jumanji (1981) and The Polar Express (1985), both of which he also wrote, and were later adapted as successful motion pictures. He was also a Caldecott runner-up in 1980 for The Garden of Abdul Gasazi. For his contribution as a children's illustrator, he was a 1986 U.S. nominee for the biennial International Hans Christian Andersen Award, the highest international recognition for creators of children's books. He received the honorary degree of Doctor of Humane Letters from the University of Michigan in April 2012.

Life and career
Van Allsburg was born on June 18, 1949 to a Dutch family in East Grand Rapids, Michigan, the second child of Doris Christianen and Richard Van Allsburg. He has a sister named Karen, born in 1947. His family lived in an old farmhouse, but when he was three years old, they moved to a Grand Rapids home near an elementary school that Chris was able to walk to for class. His family moved again to East Grand Rapids where he attended middle school and high school. 

Van Allsburg attended the College of Architecture and Design at the University of Michigan, which at that time included an art school. He majored in sculpture, learning bronze casting, wood carving, resin molding, and other techniques. 

He graduated from the University of Michigan in 1972 and continued his education at the Rhode Island School of Design (RISD), graduating with a master's degree in sculpture in 1975. After graduation, Van Allsburg set up a sculpture studio.

Van Allsburg struggled for a time with his sculpture studio. At home he began a series of sketches that his wife thought would be suitable for children's books. She showed his work to an editor who contracted his first book, The Garden of Abdul Gasazi, in 1979.

As of 2022, Van Allsburg has written and/or illustrated 21 books. His art has also been featured on the covers of an edition of C. S. Lewis's series The Chronicles of Narnia, published by HarperCollins in 1994, as well as in three children's books written by Mark Helprin.

Personal life 
Van Allsburg lives in Providence, Rhode Island with Lisa Van Allsburg, his wife since 1974. They have two daughters, Sophia and Anna. Van Allsburg converted to Judaism, his spouse's faith.

Works

Picture children's books:
 The Garden of Abdul Gasazi (1979), a Caldecott runner-up
Jumanji series:
 Jumanji (1981), a Caldecott Medal winner
 Zathura (2002)
 Ben's Dream (1982)
 The Wreck of the Zephyr (1983)
 The Mysteries of Harris Burdick, or The Chronicles of Harris Burdick: Fourteen Amazing Authors Tell the Tales (first ed., 1984; portfolio ed., 1994), with Lois Lowry, Kate DiCamillo, M. T. Anderson, Louis Sachar, Stephen King, Tabitha King, Jon Scieszka, Sherman Alexie, Gregory Maguire, Cory Doctorow, Jules Feiffer, Linda Sue Park and Walter Dean Myers
 The Polar Express (1985), a Caldecott Medal winner
 The Stranger (1986)
 The Z Was Zapped (1987)
 Two Bad Ants (1988)
 Just a Dream (1990)
 The Wretched Stone (1991)
 The Widow's Broom (1992)
 The Sweetest Fig (1993) 
 Bad Day at Riverbend (1995)
 Probuditi! (2006)
 Queen of the Falls (2011)
 The Misadventures of Sweetie Pie (2014)

Adaptations 
 Jumanji (1995), film directed by Joe Johnston, based on children's book Jumanji
 Jumanji (1996–1999), animated series, based on children's book Jumanji
 The Polar Express (2004), film directed by Robert Zemeckis, based on children's book The Polar Express
 Zathura: A Space Adventure (2005), film directed by Jon Favreau, based on children's book Zathura
 Jumanji: Welcome to the Jungle (2017), film directed by Jake Kasdan, based on children's book Jumanji
 Jumanji: The Next Level (2019), film directed by Jake Kasdan, based on children's book Jumanji
 The Garden of Abdul Gasazi  (TBA), film from Walt Disney Pictures & 20th Century Studios based on children’s book The Garden of Abdul Gasazi (in development)

Films

The Little Mermaid (1989), visual development artist
Jumanji (1995), screen story writer
How to Deal (2003), executive producer
The Polar Express (2004), executive producer

References

External links

 
 Interview with Chris Van Allsburg at Developmental Studies Center
 
 
 

1949 births
American children's writers
American science fiction writers
Caldecott Medal winners
American children's book illustrators
Converts to Judaism
Jewish American artists
Jewish American writers
Artists from Grand Rapids, Michigan
People from East Grand Rapids, Michigan
Rhode Island School of Design alumni
Writers from Grand Rapids, Michigan
Writers who illustrated their own writing
Rhode Island School of Design faculty
University of Michigan alumni
Living people
20th-century American novelists
21st-century American novelists
American male novelists
20th-century American male writers
21st-century American male writers
Novelists from Michigan
American people of Dutch descent
21st-century American Jews